Mephisto is a 1981 political drama film co-written and directed by István Szabó, and based on the novel of the same title by Klaus Mann. It stars Klaus Maria Brandauer as a German stage actor (modeled on Gustaf Gründgens) who finds unexpected success and mixed blessings in the popularity of his performance in a Faustian play as the Nazis take power in pre-WWII Germany. As his associates and friends flee or are ground under by the Nazi regime, the popularity of his character ends up superseding his own existence, until he finds that his best performance is keeping up appearances for his Nazi patrons.

The film was a co-production of Hungarian, Austrian, and West German studios; starring a mix of German and Hungarian-speaking actors. It premiered in Budapest on 11 February 1981, and received widespread acclaim from critics, winning the Academy Award for Best Foreign-Language Film, the first Hungarian picture to do so. Brandauer's performance earned him multiple accolades, including BAFTA and German Film Award nominations, and launched his film career.

Plot

The film adapts the story of Mephistopheles and Doctor Faustus by revealing the costs to the main character Hendrik Höfgen as he abandons his conscience and continues to perform, ingratiating himself with the Nazi Party in order to retain his job and improve his social position.

Höfgen (modeled on German actor Gustaf Gründgens) craves center stage. The first third of the film follows his career as a frustrated, passionate actor slogging it out in provincial theaters, occasionally dancing and singing and doing parts in films to gain notice. He even founds a Bolshevik theater with a friend to generate more work, in the avant-garde period of the early 1930s, before the Nazis came to power. Initially, Hendrik is more successful in his social and love life than as an actor. Both strands unite, however, when his new wife watches him play the ultimate role, Mephisto (the devil in the Faustus play), just before the Nazi party came to power in Germany. 

While his wife, leading actors, and friends go into exile, or protest against the new regime, Hendrik returns to Germany lured by the promise of forgiveness for his communist theatre escapade and a desire to act in his native language. When the Nazi party effectively offers to make him a star, he doesn't hesitate. Great roles and accolades quickly come his way, and Hendrik revels in his success. Hendrik reprises his greatest role as Mephisto and agrees to run the national theatre, working around the cultural restrictions and brutality of the Nazi government. He blithely overlooks the profound moral compromises of his situation, excusing himself by using the power of his close relationships with Nazi officials to help friends who would otherwise be targeted by the regime.

The plot's bitter irony is that the protagonist's fondest dream is to become Germany's greatest actor, playing Hamlet and Mephisto, but in order to achieve this dream he sells his soul. In the process, he realizes too late that he is not playing the role of Mephisto but that of Faustus; it is the Nazi leader with a major role in the film (modeled on Hermann Göring) who is the real Mephisto.

Cast

Reception
The film was the highest-grossing Hungarian film in the United States and Canada with a gross of $3.9 million.

Awards and nominations

Mephisto was the first Hungarian film to win the Foreign Language Oscar, and the only one until Son of Saul won in 2016.

See also
 List of submissions to the 54th Academy Awards for Best Foreign Language Film
 List of Hungarian submissions for the Academy Award for Best Foreign Language Film

References

External links
 
 

1981 films
1981 drama films
1980s political drama films
Hungarian drama films
German political drama films
Austrian drama films
West German films
German-language films
Hungarian-language films
Films about actors
Films about Nazi Germany
Films set in the 1930s
Films about interracial romance
Films based on German novels
Films directed by István Szabó
Best Foreign Language Film Academy Award winners
Works based on the Faust legend
Films set in a theatre
German biographical drama films
Films à clef